opened in Kasama, Ibaraki Prefecture, Japan, in 1972.

See also

 The Museum of Modern Art, Ibaraki

References

External links
  Kasama Nichidō Museum of Art
  Kasama Nichidō Museum of Art

Museums in Ibaraki Prefecture
Art museums and galleries in Japan
Kasama, Ibaraki
Museums established in 1972
1972 establishments in Japan